is a railway station located in the city of Ōdate, Akita Prefecture, Japan, operated by the East Japan Railway Company (JR East).

Lines

Station layout
The station consists of one side platform serving a single bi-directional track. The station is unattended.

History
Sawajiri Station was opened on July 11, 1928 on the privately owned Akita Railways, serving the town of Jūnisho, Akita. The line was nationalized on June 1, 1934, becoming part of the Japanese Government Railways (JGR) system. The station was closed from November 11, 1944, reopening on February 1, 1962 as part of the Japan National Railways (JNR). The station was absorbed into the JR East network upon the privatization of the JNR on April 1, 1987.

Surrounding area

See also
 List of Railway Stations in Japan

External links

 JR East Station information 

Railway stations in Japan opened in 1928
Railway stations in Akita Prefecture
Stations of East Japan Railway Company
Ōdate
Hanawa Line